University of Puerto Rico strikes may refer to:

 University of Puerto Rico strikes, 2010–11, University of Puerto Rico student strikes of 2010 and 2011
 University of Puerto Rico strikes, 2017, University of Puerto Rico student strikes of 2017

See also
 University of Puerto Rico